The Gotland Runic Inscription 207  is a Viking Age runestone engraved in Old Norse with the Younger Futhark runic alphabet. It is from c. 1100 and is located behind the organ in the tower room of Stenkumla Church on Gotland. It is raised in memory of a man who had been south with his comrades selling pelts, but he was killed in Ulvshale on the Danish island of Møn.

Inscription
Transliteration of the runes into Latin characters

 butmuntr : auk : butraifʀ : auk : kunu[ar : þaiʀ : raistu : stain ...arþi : karþ] : auk : sunarla : sat : miþ : skinum : auk : han : entaþis : at : ulfshala : þa : [¶ han : hil(k)(i)...]

Old Norse transcription:

 

English translation:

 "Bótmundr and Bótreifr and Gunnvarr, they raised the stone ... farm and sat in the south with the skins (= traded fur). And he met his end at Ulfshala/Ulvshale ..."

References

12th-century inscriptions
Rune- and picture stones on Gotland